Cole McNary (born July 10, 1964) is an American educator and a former Republican member of the Missouri House of Representatives. He represented the 86th district, which includes Chesterfield from 2009 to 2013.  He was the Republican nominee for Missouri State Treasurer in the 2012 election.  He subsequently ran for the Monarch Fire Board.

Early life and career
Cole McNary is the son of Gene McNary, the former Commissioner of the Immigration and Naturalization Service, Executive Director of the Missouri Gaming Commission, and County Executive of St. Louis County. His mother is Ina Risch McNary Tornallyay.

The younger McNary attended Lindbergh High School in St. Louis County.  He then obtained a bachelor's degree in Aviation Management from Auburn University and a Master of Business Administration from St. Louis University.  He worked with business analysis and sales before getting a Teaching Certificate in Physics from The University of Missouri-St. Louis and becoming a teacher.  Before becoming a State Rep. he worked for St. John Vianney High School where he taught mathematics and physics.  McNary met his wife, Christy, while campaigning for his father.  They have three children and attend United Methodist Church of Green Trails in Chesterfield.

Political career
In 2008, McNary ran for the Missouri House of Representatives.  He defeated five opponents in the Republican primary, winning with 48.5 percent of the vote.  McNary then went on to win the general election against Martha "Marty" Ott, with 57.94% of the vote.  In 2010, he won reelection without opposition.  He was one of thirty-nine state legislators to sign a no new taxes pledge.  After redistricting drew incumbent Missouri State Representatives John Diehl and Rick Stream into the same district as McNary, McNary declared his intention to run for State Treasurer of Missouri in 2012.  A large part of his campaign was his experience as chairman of the downsizing state government committee in the state house.  He won the Republican nomination but lost in the general election to incumbent Democrat Clint Zweifel.

Electoral history

References

External links 
 Cole McNary for Missouri State Treasurer
 Official Missouri House of Representatives profile
 Interest Group Ratings
 Campaign Finance Information

Republican Party members of the Missouri House of Representatives
Living people
Politicians from St. Louis County, Missouri
Auburn University alumni
Saint Louis University alumni
University of Missouri–St. Louis alumni
1964 births